Terramar may refer to:

Places
 Terramar, Carlsbad, California, United States, a neighborhood
 Terramar Visitor Center, a visitor center and museum at Hugh Taylor Birch State Park in Fort Lauderdale, Florida, United States
 Autódromo de Sitges-Terramar, a former racing circuit in Barcelona, Catalonia, Spain

Other
 The TerraMar Project, a former American environmental nonprofit organization
 Cupra Terramar, a 2024– Spanish compact performance SUV

See also
 Terramare culture, an archaeological culture in Northern Italy